Larry Dean Martin (December 8, 1943 – March 9, 2013) was an American vertebrate paleontologist and curator of the Natural History Museum and Biodiversity Research Center at the University of Kansas. Among Martin's work is research on the Triassic reptile Longisquama and theropod dinosaur (or fossil bird) Caudipteryx and Dakotaraptor.   According to the University of Kansas, he "has been a leading opponent of the theory that birds are 'living dinosaurs.'" Later he acknowledged a correlation and further contributed. 
He has also appeared in a few television documentaries about dinosaurs, including Jurassic Fight Club.

He died of cancer at the age of 69 on March 9, 2013, after a long battle with the disease.

References

External links
 KU paleontologist to lecture on 4-winged wonder and feathered dinosaurs (Kansas University press release)
 Kansas University Natural History Museum and Biodiversity Research Center
 University of Kansas Departmental Profile

1943 births
2013 deaths
Deaths from cancer
American paleontologists
American ornithologists